This is a list of flags of entities named related to Somalia.

National flags

Regional flags

State flags

Regions

Other

Military flags

Police flags

Political flags

Historical flags
The following are the flags historically used in the territory of present-day Somalia:

Pre-colonial states

Italian Somaliland

British Somaliland

See also 
Flag of Somalia
Flag of Somaliland

References 

Somali

Flags